Roadrunner is an album released by the Finnish rock band Hurriganes in 1974. It is considered one of the most influential albums in Finnish rock music history. It was the best-selling Finnish album from 1974 to 1985 and has sold over 170,000 copies in Finland. The album was recorded in Stockholm, Sweden at Marcus Music studios. The album cover features the band members sitting on a backseat of a Cadillac in Ruskeasuo, Helsinki. The cover has been chosen many times as the best album cover in Finland.

Track listing

All songs written and composed by Hurriganes, except where noted.

Chart positions

Personnel

Remu Aaltonen – Lead vocals, drums
Albert Järvinen – Guitar
Cisse Häkkinen – Bass guitar, Backing vocals, Lead vocals in tracks 4, 5. Acoustic guitar in the song "I will stay"
Richard Stanley (”Mister X”) – vocals in ”Mister X”, producer
Leif Måses – Recorder

See also
List of best-selling albums in Finland

References

 
 
 
Hurriganes collection site

1974 albums
Hurriganes albums